Antônia Ronnycleide da Costa Silva (born 26 April 1994), simply known as Antônia, is a Brazilian professional footballer who plays as a centre back for Spanish Primera División club Levante UD and the Brazil women's national team.

Club career
Antônia has played for ABC FC, AA Ponte Preta, Grêmio Osasco Audax EC and EC Iranduba da Amazônia in Brazil and for Madrid CFF in Spain.

International career
Antônia played for Brazil at the 2020 Tournoi de France.

References

External links

1994 births
Living people
Sportspeople from Rio Grande do Norte
Brazilian women's footballers
Women's association football central defenders
Madrid CFF players
Primera División (women) players
Brazil women's international footballers
Brazilian expatriate women's footballers
Brazilian expatriate sportspeople in Spain
Expatriate women's footballers in Spain